"Final Form" is a song by Zambian singer/songwriter Sampa the Great. The song was released on 5 June 2019 as the second single from Sampa the Great's debut studio album, The Return. The song samples The Sylvers' 1973 funk track "Stay Away from Me" and Blood, Sweat & Tears’ “Spinning Wheel”.

Sampa described the song as being about "expanding yourself and calling out any negativity towards that growth process".

At the ARIA Music Awards of 2019, the song won the ARIA award for Best Hip Hop Release. At the APRA Music Awards of 2020, the song was shortlisted for Song of the Year.

Critical reception
Al Newstead of Triple J described the single as "breathtaking", saying "like her best tracks, 'Final Form' has an empowering effect that makes you feel ferocious, insurmountable; like you could take on the world and win without breaking a sweat."

In a review of the parent album, The Musics Madelyn Tait said the song was "confident, empowering and intrinsically connected to Tembo's heritage." 

Rachel Aroesti of The Guardian referred to the track as an album highlight in an album review.

Track listing

Awards and nominations
ARIA Music Awards

|-
| rowspan="2"| 2019
| rowspan="2"| "Final Form"
| ARIA Award for Best Hip Hop Release
| 
|-
| Best Video
| 
|-

References

External links
 

2019 singles
2019 songs
Sampa the Great songs
ARIA Award-winning songs
Songs written by Sampa the Great